SpVgg Erkenschwick is a German football club based in Oer-Erkenschwick in North Rhine-Westphalia.

History 
Founded as Sportverein Erkenschwick in 1916, they joined Emscher-Lippe-Spielverband to form Sportfreunde Erkenschwick in 1918, which in then merged with Turn- und Leichtathletikverein TV Erkenschwick in 1921 to form the sports club still known today as TuS 09 Erkenschwick. The football side separated from this club and joined the footballers from Blau-Weiss Oer to form SpVgg Erkenschwick.

The side was competitive from 1943 through to 1953, playing top-flight football in the Gauliga Westfalen until the end of World War II and in the Oberliga West (I) immediately after the war.

Through the 1970s, 1980s, and 1990s, Erkenschwick played as a third division side with just three seasons spent in the 2. Bundesliga (1974–75, 1975–76, and 1980–81). At the turn of the century they slipped to fourth and fifth level competition, and, since 2012, play in Oberliga Westfalen (V) again.

Honours 
The club's honours:
 Oberliga Westfalen (III)
 Champions: 1980, 1987
 Verbandsliga Westfalen Nordost (IV)
 Champions: 1965, 1967, 1968
 Verbandsliga Westfalen Südwest (V)
 Champions: 2004
 Westphalia Cup
 Winners: 1987, 1993

External links 
  
 Abseits Guide to German Soccer

Football clubs in Germany
Football clubs in North Rhine-Westphalia
Association football clubs established in 1916
1916 establishments in Germany
Recklinghausen (district)
2. Bundesliga clubs